Christian Stofer (born 23 January 1976) is a Swiss former rower. He competed at the 2000 Summer Olympics and the 2004 Summer Olympics.

References

External links
 

1976 births
Living people
Swiss male rowers
Olympic rowers of Switzerland
Rowers at the 2000 Summer Olympics
Rowers at the 2004 Summer Olympics
People from Sursee District
Sportspeople from the canton of Lucerne